Siddharthnagar railway station is a famous railway station in Siddharthnagar district, Uttar Pradesh. Its code is SDDN. It serves Siddharthnagar. The station consists of three platforms.

The station is located on the way to Gorakhpur from Gonda via broad gauge of North Eastern Railway.

References

Railway stations in Siddharthnagar district
Lucknow NER railway division